Thomas, Tommy or Tom Tucker may refer to:

Music
 Tommy Tucker (bandleader) (1903–1989), big band leader in the 1930s
 Tommy Tucker (singer) (1933–1982), American blues singer and songwriter
 "Tommy Tucker", song by the band Bow Wow Wow

Politics
 Thomas Tudor Tucker (1745–1828), Continental Congressman
SS Thomas T. Tucker
 Tommy Tucker (politician) (born 1950), state senator in the U.S. state of North Carolina

Sports
 Tommy Tucker (baseball) (1863–1935), American first baseman
 Thomas Tucker (cricketer) (1796–1832), English cricketer associated with Cambridge University
 Tom Tucker (footballer) (1912–1982), Australian footballer for Collingwood

Characters
 Little Tommy Tucker, nursery rhyme character
 Tom Tucker (Family Guy), a character on Family Guy
 Tom Tucker: The Man and His Dream, an episode from the television series Family Guy, featuring the fictional news anchor Tom Tucker
Tommy Tucker (squirrel), a tame touring squirrel

Other
 Thomas DeSaille Tucker (fl. 1844–1903), first president of Florida A&M University
 Thomas George Tucker (1859–1946), Anglo-Australian academic, classicist, professor at the University of Melbourne
 Thomas W. Tucker (born 1945), American mathematician, Colgate University, topological graph theory
 Thomas Lowell Tucker (1981–2006), U.S. Army soldier who was killed in the Iraq War
 Thomas Tudor Tucker (Royal Navy officer) (1775–1852), British admiral